Joseph Cole is an American cinematographer and film producer. He was raised on Mercer Island, where he met his lifelong friend and collaborator, Bjorn Anderson. Soon after Joseph had graduated from the New York Film Academy, Bjorn had pitched the idea for their first feature film together, Warrior's End which was named 40th on Looper.com's "80 Best Medieval Movies of All Time Ranked". They worked together again on the horror movie, Eyes in the Dark.

References

External links
 Joseph Cole’s Official Website
 

Living people
American cinematographers
New York Film Academy alumni
People from Mercer Island, Washington
Film producers from Washington (state)
Year of birth missing (living people)